Association Sportive et Culturelle Yakaar is a Senegalese football club based in Rufisque. They play in the top division in Senegalese football. Their home stadium is Stade Ngalandou Diouf.

Achievements
Senegal Premier League: 0

Senegal FA Cup: 0

Coupe de la Ligue: 0

Senegal Assemblée Nationale Cup: 1
 2008.

Performance in CAF competitions
CAF Confederation Cup: 1 appearance
2009 - First Round

Current squad

Notable players
 Amado Diallo
 Makhete Diop

Football clubs in Senegal
Sports clubs in Dakar